Spencer James Pigot (born September 29, 1993) is an American racing driver who currently drives in the IMSA SportsCar Championship.

Personal life
Pigot was born in Los Angeles and raised Pasadena, California, and Orlando where he graduated from Windermere Preparatory School. He currently resides in Indianapolis.

Racing career

Early career
After a successful career in youth karting, Pigot joined the Skip Barber National Championship in 2010 and won the title and a Mazdaspeed scholarship. He was also awarded the Team USA Scholarship to compete in the Formula Ford Festival in England. In 2011 he joined the U.S. F2000 National Championship, part of the Mazda Road to Indy, driving for Andretti Autosport. He finished second in points with three wins. In 2012, he continued in the series, switching teams to Cape Motorsports with Wayne Taylor Racing. He won the 2012 U.S. F2000 Winterfest in the preseason, but again finished second in the main championship, but this time only missed out on the title by 7 points to Matthew Brabham. Pigot captured eight race wins compared to Brabham's four. In 2013 Pigot moved up the Road to Indy ladder into the Pro Mazda Championship with Team Pelfrey. He finished tied for third in points with Shelby Blackstock, but Blackstock won the tie-breaker for third by virtue of having three third place finishes to Pigot's one. Both drivers had one win and three-second place finishes.

In 2014 Pigot switched teams in Pro Mazda to Juncos Racing. He won the first four races of the season and captured the title in a controversial fight with Scott Hargrove. His championship earned him a scholarship to compete in Indy Lights in 2015.

2015 saw Pigot clinch the Indy Lights championship by sweeping the final two races at Mazda Raceway Laguna Seca. He won a scholarship to compete in the 100th running of the Indianapolis 500 in the IndyCar Series and in November signed with Rahal Letterman Lanigan Racing.

IndyCar Series

Pigot competed at the season opener at the Honda Grand Prix of St. Petersburg and finished 14th. His next race was the Grand Prix of Indianapolis where he finished eleventh. In the 2016 Indianapolis 500 he qualified on the tenth row in 29th and finished the race in 25th, five laps down, the last car running, after running out of fuel mid-race during a caution flag. The next week it was announced that Pigot would drive in seven more road and street course races throughout the season for Ed Carpenter Racing in the No. 20 car driven by Ed Carpenter on ovals.

In January 2017, it was announced that Pigot would return for a second season as road and street course driver in the Ed Carpenter Racing No. 20 entry. It was confirmed on May 9, 2017 that Pigot would rejoin Juncos Racing for the 2017 Indianapolis 500.

Ed Carpenter Racing announced on September 13, 2017 that Pigot would compete full-time in IndyCar Series for the first time in 2018. 

In 2020, Pigot competed on a part-time basis.  His second race of the season was the 2020 Indianapolis 500, where he spun with five laps to go out of turn 4.  His car ended up making significant contact with the wall at the entrance to pit road.  Pigot was transferred to Indiana University Health Methodist Hospital, but recovered and was released by the end of the day.

Sports cars
In addition to IndyCar, 2016 saw Pigot make his WeatherTech SportsCar Championship debut. Pigot drove four races in the No. 55 Mazda prototype entry including the Rolex 24. He has retained the role for the 2017 season. Pigot earned his first career IMSA podium with a third place finish at the 2017 Six Hours of the Glen
Pigot was announced in November 2017 as a driver with the newly formed Mazda Team Joest for 2018 endurance races as part of the WeatherTech Sports Car Championship. In 2020, Pigot was a sub for Simon Trummer in a WTSCC race, driving Trummer's LMP2 entry in the Grand Prix of Sebring.

American open-wheel racing results

(key)

U.S. F2000 National Championship

Pro Mazda Championship

Indy Lights

IndyCar Series

* Season still in progress.

Indianapolis 500

Complete WeatherTech SportsCar Championship results
(key)(Races in bold indicate pole position)

† Points only counted towards the Michelin Endurance Cup, and not the overall LMP3 Championship.

References

External links

1993 births
Living people
Sportspeople from Pasadena, California
Racing drivers from California
Indy Pro 2000 Championship drivers
Indy Lights champions
Indy Lights drivers
IndyCar Series drivers
U.S. F2000 National Championship drivers
WeatherTech SportsCar Championship drivers
24 Hours of Daytona drivers
Indianapolis 500 drivers
Racing drivers from Florida
Ed Carpenter Racing drivers
Andretti Autosport drivers
Wayne Taylor Racing drivers
Team Pelfrey drivers
Juncos Hollinger Racing drivers
Rahal Letterman Lanigan Racing drivers
Team Joest drivers
Team West-Tec drivers
Euroformula Open Championship drivers
Michelin Pilot Challenge drivers